Robert Cohen is a Canadian comedy writer and director.

Cohen's writing career has covered many TV formats, from sketch to multi-camera, single-camera and animation.  He has also written for many high-profile awards shows and specials, including multiple times for the Academy Awards and Emmy Awards.

Early life
Cohen was born to a Jewish family in Calgary, Alberta, where he attended the Calgary Hebrew School.

Career
Cohen has written for The Simpsons, The Wonder Years, The Ben Stiller Show, and The Big Bang Theory.

He won a Primetime Emmy Award for his work on The Ben Stiller Show. He and frequent collaborator Dana Gould co-created the 1998 cult show Super Adventure Team for MTV.  His career as a TV comedy writer has covered every format, from multi-camera and single-camera, to sketch and animation.  Robert has also written for and produced on multiple Emmy Award, Academy Award and MTV Movie Award shows.

Cohen has directed and won awards for commercial campaigns for Ziploc, Kraft, HBO, Ford and many others.  Some of the TV shows he has directed are "Lady Dynamite", "Maron", "Speechless", "Mystery Science Theater 3000: The Return", "Stan Against Evil", and others.

Personal life 
Cohen is married to Jimmy Kimmel Live! producer Jill Leiderman. Upon their engagement, he learned that he had been legally married to his ex-girlfriend, actress Janeane Garofalo, for the last twenty years, after what they had believed to have been a "joke wedding" in Las Vegas in 1991. They had both thought the marriage was not binding unless it had been filed at a local courthouse. The union was dissolved in 2012.

Awards

|-
| 1993
| The Ben Stiller Show
| Emmys "Outstanding individual achievement in Writing in a Variety or Music Program"
| 
|-
| 2004
| In recognition of extraordinary courage shown in... efforts to advance animation organizing
| Robert Metzler Award
| 
|-
| 2016
| Being Canadian
| Writers Guild of America Award "Best Documentary Screenplay"
| 
|-
| 2016
| Best Director - Short Form Film
|  2016 Webby Award
| 
|-
| 2017
| "Primetime Emmy Awards"
| Writers Guild of America Award "Best Writing for a Variety Special"
|

References

External links
 
 Suicide Girls Interview

Living people
Canadian humorists
Canadian television writers
Jewish Canadian comedians
Year of birth missing (living people)
Jewish Canadian writers
Primetime Emmy Award winners
Writers from Calgary
Canadian expatriate writers in the United States